Jean-Pierre Baldini (born 1949 in Cannes, France) is a sculptor.  He studied at school of fine arts in Nîmes with the Spanish sculptor Almela.

He started sculpting in wood. Then in 1984,  he worked exclusively in bronze, his material of choice.  His works were exhibited for the first time in the city hall of Arles. Starting in 1986, his works started to attract the interest of art galleries and museums in France. In 2015, he finished a book entitled, Trace. It contains photographs (by Hervé Hôte) of his sculptures and carving.

References

External links 
 

20th-century French sculptors
20th-century French male artists
French male sculptors
21st-century French sculptors
21st-century French male artists
Living people
1949 births